Mussorgsky, the name of an old Russian noble family, which is one of the branches of rich boyar family of Monastyrev, descendants of princes of Smolensk from Rurikid stock. The family traces its name to Roman Vasilyevich Monastyrev, nicknamed Mussorga (18th generation from Rurik). Peter Ivanovich Mussorgsky governed Staritsa in 1620. One representative of this family is the great composer Modest Petrovich Mussorgsky.

History 
In the genealogy of the Princes of Smolensk, which is in the velvet and other genealogical books, it is shown that the great-grandson of the Great Prince Vladimir Svyatoslavich who baptized the Rus' land, the Grand Duke Vladimir Vsevolodovich Monomakh had a son Mstislav, Prince of Smolensk, and this one had a son Rostislav, Prince of Smolensk. The aforementioned Prince Mstislav had a great-grandson, Grand Duke Yuri Svyatoslavich of Smolensk. After the death of his father Yuri, the underaged Prince Alexander was taken by his grandmother  — Princess Nastasia — who bought him a votchina in the White Lakes, became a num and nursed him in the monastery, from which he was called Alexander the Monastery (Александр Монастырь), and from him, the Monastyrevs started. Children of Alexander had lost the titles of Princes.

Aladyin family was the only family of Monastyrevs stock, including the Monastyrevs themselves, to receive a coat of arms from the ruling Holstein-Gottorp-Romanov dynasty. In 1857, Prince Peter Dolgorukov didn't deny their ancestry but explicitly questioned their future existence writing only 5 lines about the family, finishing the paragraph with the anti-punctuation [?.] two signs together: "For their origin, see the previous article about the Monastyrevs. Lyapun and Tretyak, the Yakov children, the Musorgskies, were granted estates in the Moscow district on 2 October 1550. Two Mussorgskys owned inhabited estates in 1699. The coat of arms of this family is not in the armorial, and we doubt whether it [the feminine word for 'family' in Russian is also identical to 'surname' in English] still exists today?."

References 

Russian noble families
Rurikids
Modest Mussorgsky